Studiobühne Siegburg  is a privately owned theatre in the city of Siegburg in North Rhine-Westphalia, Germany.

External links 

 Studiobhne Siegburg (german only)

Theatres in North Rhine-Westphalia
Rhein-Sieg-Kreis